Joël Denis Bourgeois (born April 25, 1971 in Moncton, New Brunswick) is a middle and long-distance runner competing for Canada. He represented Canada twice at the Summer Olympics in 1996 and 2000.

Biography
He won the gold medal for Canada in the men's 3000 metres steeplechase at the 1999 Pan American Games in Winnipeg, Manitoba, Canada, and the silver medal in the same event at the 2003 Pan American Games in Santo Domingo, Dominican Republic. He won the silver medal for Canada in the men's 3000 metres steeplechase at the 1995 summer Universiade and the bronze medal in the same event at the 1999. 

Still competing in competitions around Canada and at world master events, Bourgeois' goal is to coach the next generation of champions, including Geneviève Lalonde and Ryan Cassidy who have both became Canadian champions in the steeplechase and distance events and have represented Canada in various international events, including the 2010 World Junior Championships in Athletics, held in Moncton, New Brunswick.

Statistics

Personal bests

Competition record

See also
Athletics New Brunswick

References

External links
 
 
 2000 Olympic Profile for Joël Bourgeois
 

1971 births
Living people
Canadian male long-distance runners
Canadian male steeplechase runners
Athletes (track and field) at the 1996 Summer Olympics
Athletes (track and field) at the 2000 Summer Olympics
Athletes (track and field) at the 1995 Pan American Games
Athletes (track and field) at the 1999 Pan American Games
Athletes (track and field) at the 2003 Pan American Games
Athletes (track and field) at the 1994 Commonwealth Games
Athletes (track and field) at the 1998 Commonwealth Games
Athletes (track and field) at the 2002 Commonwealth Games
Olympic track and field athletes of Canada
Commonwealth Games competitors for Canada
Sportspeople from Moncton
People from Kent County, New Brunswick
Pan American Games gold medalists for Canada
Pan American Games silver medalists for Canada
Pan American Games medalists in athletics (track and field)
Universiade medalists in athletics (track and field)
Snowshoe runners
Universiade silver medalists for Canada
Medalists at the 1995 Summer Universiade
Medalists at the 1999 Summer Universiade
Medalists at the 1999 Pan American Games
Medalists at the 2003 Pan American Games